Catherinas Lust is an estate (large agricultural landholding) located approximately 13.8 km from the town of Fort Wellington in the Mahaica-Berbice region of Guyana in South America. It is listed as a village in the 2012 census.

It is also the name of a housing scheme Catherina's Lust, South.

References

Populated places in Mahaica-Berbice